It is believed that the first Jews in England arrived during the Norman Conquest of the country by William the Conqueror (the future William I) in 1066. The first written record of Jewish settlement in England dates from 1070. They suffered massacres in 1189–90. In 1290, all Jews were expelled from England by the Edict of Expulsion.

William I to Henry I: 1066–1135
There is no record of Jews in England before the Norman Conquest in 1066. The few references to Jews in the Anglo-Saxon laws of the Roman Catholic Church relate to Jewish practices about Easter.

Believing that their commercial skills and incoming capital would make England more prosperous, William I (William the Conqueror) invited a group of Jewish merchants from Rouen, in Normandy, to England in 1070. However, Jews were not permitted to own land or to participate in trades (except for medicine). They were limited primarily to money lending. As Catholic doctrine held that money lending for interest was the sin of usury, Jews dominated this activity. The earliest immigrants spoke Judeo-French founded on the Norman dialect.

Around 1092, Gilbert Crispin, the Abbot of Westminster, issued a disputation about his exchange with a Jew, entitled "Disputation of a Jew with a Christian about the Christian Bible." Crispin wrote that:

This disputation was notable for the even-handed presentation of both the Christian and Jewish points of view, and for the congenial tone of the exchange.

At first, the status of Jews was not strictly determined. An attempt was made to introduce the continental principle that all Jews were the king's property and a clause to that effect was inserted under King Henry I in some manuscripts of the so-called Leges Edwardi Confessoris "Laws of Edward the Confessor".

However, during Henry's reign (1100–1135) a royal charter was granted to Joseph, the chief rabbi of London, and all his followers. Under this charter, Jews were permitted to move about the country without paying tolls, to buy and sell goods and property, to sell their pledges after holding them a year and a day, to be tried by their peers, and to be sworn on the Torah rather than on a Christian Bible. Special weight was attributed to a Jewish person's oath, which was valid against that of 12 Christians, because they represented the king of England in financial matters. The sixth clause of the charter was especially important: it granted Jews the right of movement throughout the kingdom, as if they were the king's own property (sicut res propriæ nostræ).

Jews did not settle outside of London before 1135.

Stephen to Henry II: 1135–1189

Christian-Jewish relations in England were disturbed under King Stephen who burned down the house of a Jewish man in Oxford (some accounts say with the owner in it) because he refused to pay a contribution to the king's expenses. It was also during this time that the first recorded blood libel against Jews was brought in the case of William of Norwich (March, 1144).

While the crusaders in Germany were attacking Jews, outbursts against the latter in England were, according to the Jewish chroniclers, prevented by King Stephen.

With the restoration of order under Henry II, Jews renewed their activity. Within five years of his accession, Jews are found at London, Oxford, Cambridge, Norwich, Thetford, Bungay, Canterbury, Winchester, Newport, Stafford, Windsor, and Reading. However, they were not permitted to bury their dead elsewhere than in London until 1177. Their spread throughout the country enabled the king to draw upon them as occasion demanded; he repaid them by demand notes on the sheriffs of the counties, who accounted for payments thus made in the half-yearly accounts on the pipe rolls (see Aaron of Lincoln).

Strongbow's conquest of Ireland (1170) was financed by Josce, a Jewish man from Gloucester; and the king accordingly fined Josce for having lent money to those under his displeasure. As a rule, however, Henry II does not appear to have limited in any way the financial activity of Jews. The favourable position of the English Jews was shown, among other things, by the visit of Abraham ibn Ezra in 1158, by that of Isaac of Chernigov in 1181, and by the resort to England of the Jews who were exiled from France by Philip Augustus in 1182, among them probably being Judah Sir Leon of Paris.

In 1168, when concluding an alliance with Frederick Barbarossa, Henry II seized the chief representatives of the Jews and sent them to Normandy, while tallaging the rest 5,000 marks). When, however, he asked the rest of the country to pay a tithe for the crusade against Saladin in 1186, he demanded a quarter of the Jewish chattels. The tithe was reckoned at £70,000, the quarter at £60,000. It is improbable, however, that the whole amount was paid at once, as for many years after the imposition of the tallage arrears were demanded from the Jews.

The king had probably been led to make this large demand upon  English Jewry by the surprising windfall which came to his treasury at the death of Aaron of Lincoln. In this period, Aaron of Lincoln is believed to have been, probably, the wealthiest man in 12th-century Britain, in liquid assets. All property obtained by usury, whether Jewish or Christian, fell into the king's hands on Aaron's death; his estate included £15,000 of debts owed by some 430 debtors scattered around the English counties. In order to track down and collect these debts a special section of the Royal Exchequer was constituted, which was known as the "Aaron's Exchequer". The cash treasure of the Aaron's estate, that came into the king's hands, however, was lost on a shipwreck during a transport to Normandy.

In this era, Jews lived on good terms with their non-Jewish neighbours, including the clergy; they entered churches freely, and took refuge in the abbeys in times of commotion. Some Jews lived in opulent houses, and helped to build a large number of abbeys and monasteries. However, by the end of Henry's reign they had incurred the ill will of the upper classes, and anti-Jewish sentiment spread further throughout the nation, fostered by the crusades.

Massacres at London and York (1189–1190)

Richard I had taken the cross before his coronation (3 September 1189). A number of the principal Jews of England presented themselves to do homage at Westminster; but there was a long-standing custom against Jews (and women) being admitted to the coronation ceremony, and they were expelled during the banquet which followed the coronation, whereupon they were attacked by a crowd of bystanders. The rumour spread from Westminster to London that the king had ordered a massacre of the Jews; and a mob in the Old Jewry, after vainly attacking the strong stone houses of the Jews throughout the day, set them on fire at night, killing those within who attempted to escape. The king was enraged at this insult to his royal dignity, but was unable to punish more than a few of the offenders, owing to their large numbers and to the considerable social standing of several of them. After his departure on the crusade, riots with loss of life occurred at Lynn, where the Jews attempted to attack a baptised coreligionist who had taken refuge in a church. The seafaring population rose against them, fired their houses, and put them to the sword. So, too, at Stamford Fair, on 7 March 1190, many were slain, and on 18 March, 57 were slaughtered at Bury St Edmunds. The Jews of Lincoln saved themselves only by taking refuge in the castle.

Isolated attacks on Jews also occurred at Colchester, Thetford, and Ospringe.

A significant loss of life occurred at York on the night of March 16 (Shabbat HaGadol, the Shabbat before Passover) and 17 March 1190. As crusaders prepared to leave on the Third Crusade, religious fervour resulted in several anti-Jewish violences. Josce of York, the leader of the Jews in York, asked the warden of York Castle to receive them with their wives and children, and they were accepted into Clifford's Tower. However, the tower was besieged by the mob of crusaders, demanding that the Jews convert to Christianity and be baptized. Trapped in the castle, the Jews were advised by their religious leader, Rabbi Yomtov of Joigny, to kill themselves rather than convert; Josce began by slaying his wife Anna and his two children, and then was killed by Yomtov. The father of each family killed his wife and children, before Yomtov and Josce set fire to the wooden keep, killing themselves. The handful of Jews who did not kill themselves died in the fire, or were murdered by rioters. Around 150 people are thought to have been killed in the incident.

Ordinance of the Jewry, 1194
During Richard's absence in the Holy Land and during his captivity, the Jews of England were harassed by William de Longchamp. The Jewish community was forced to contribute 5,000 marks toward the king's ransom, more than three times as much as the contribution of the City of London.

On his return, Richard determined to organise the Jewish community in order to ensure that he should no longer be defrauded of his just dues as universal legatee of the Jewry by any such outbreaks as those that occurred after his coronation. Richard accordingly decided, in 1194, that records should be kept by royal officials of all the transactions of the Jews, without which such transactions would not be legal.

Every debt was to be entered upon a chirograph, one part of which was to be kept by the Jewish creditor, and the other preserved in a chest to which only special officials should have access. By this means the king could at any time ascertain the property of any Jew in the land; and no destruction of the bond held by a Jew could release the creditor from his indebtedness.

This "Ordinance of the Jewry" was, in practice, the beginning of the office of Exchequer of the Jews, which made all the transactions of the English Jewry liable to taxation by the King of England, who thus became a sleeping partner in all the transactions of Jewish money lending. The king besides demanded two bezants in the pound, that is, 10 per cent, of all sums recovered by the Jews with the aid of his courts.

At this point in time Jews had many of the same rights as gentile citizens. However, their loans could be recovered at law, whereas the Christian money lender could not recover more than his original loan. They were in direct relation to the king and his courts; but this did not imply any arbitrary power of the king to tax them or to take their money without repayment, as is frequently exemplified in the pipe rolls.

Leadership of the Chief Rabbis, 13th century
Jews were allowed to have their own jurisdiction, and there is evidence of their having a beth din with three judges. Reference is made to the parnas (president) and gabbai (treasurer), of the congregation, and to scribes and chirographers. A complete system of education seems to have been in vogue.

At the head of the Jewish community was placed a chief rabbi, known as "the presbyter of all the Jews of England"; he appears to have been selected by the Jews themselves, who were granted a congé d'élire by the king. The latter claimed, however, the right of confirmation, as in the case of bishops. The Jewish presbyter was indeed in a measure a royal official, holding the position of adviser, as regards Jewish law, to the Exchequer of the Jews, as the English legal system admitted the validity of Jewish law in its proper sphere as much as it did that of the canon law.

Six presbyters are known in the 13th century: Jacob of London, reappointed 1200; Josce of London, 1207; Aaron of York, 1237; Elyas of London, 1243; Hagin fil Cresse, 1257; and Cresse fil Mosse.

Under John, 1205–1216
As early as 1198 Pope Innocent III had written to all Christian princes, including Richard of England, calling upon them to compel the remission of all usury demanded by Jews from Christians. This would render the Jewish community's very existence impossible.

On 15 July 1205, the pope laid down the principle that Jews were doomed to perpetual servitude because they had crucified Jesus. In England the secular power soon followed the initiative of the Church. John, having become indebted to the Jewish community while in Ireland, at first treated Jews with a show of forbearance. He confirmed the charter of Rabbi Josce and his sons, and made it apply to all the Jews of England; he wrote a sharp remonstrance to the mayor of London against the attacks that were continually being made upon the Jews of that city, alone of all the cities of England. He reappointed one Jacob archpriest of all the English Jews (12 July 1199).

But with the loss of Normandy in 1205 a new spirit seems to have come over the attitude of John to his Jews. In the height of his triumph over the pope, he demanded the sum of no less than £100,000 from the religious houses of England, and 66,000 marks from the Jews (1210). One of the latter, Abraham of Bristol, who refused to pay his quota of 10,000 marks, had, by order of the king, seven of his teeth extracted, one a day, until he was willing to disgorge.

Though John squeezed as much as he could out of the Jewish community, they were an important element on his side in the triangular struggle between king, barons, and municipalities which makes up the constitutional history of England during his reign and that of his son. Even in the Magna Carta, clauses were inserted preventing the king or his Jewish subjects from obtaining interest during the minority of an heir.

Increasing persecution, 13th century
With the accession of Henry III (1216) the position of the Jews became somewhat easier, but only for a short time. Innocent III had in the preceding year caused the Fourth Council of the Lateran to pass the law enforcing the Badge upon the Jews; and in 1218 Stephen Langton, Archbishop of Canterbury, brought it into operation in England, the badge taking the form of an oblong white patch of two finger-lengths by four. The action of the Church was followed by similar opposition on the part of the English boroughs.

Petitions were accordingly sent to the king in many instances to remove his Jews from the boroughs, and they were expelled from Bury St. Edmunds in 1190, Newcastle in 1234, Wycombe in 1235, Southampton in 1236, Berkhamsted in 1242, Newbury in 1244. Simon de Montfort issued an edict to expel the Jewish population from Leicester in 1231, "in my time or in the time of any of my heirs to the end of the world". He justified his action as being "for the good of my soul, and for the souls of my ancestors and successors". The Jews appear to have found refuge in the suburbs outside his control.

The Papacy continued to develop its theological commitment to restrictions on Judaism and Jews. In England, a number of Benedictine priories showed particular hostility to Jews, or sought to capitalise on it. The fictional stories of Jewish ritual murder, for instance, emerged from Benedictine priories, apparently attempting to set competing local cults. In Worcester, Bishop William de Blois pushed for tighter restrictions on Jews, writing to Pope Gregory IX for assistance in enforcing segregation between Jews and Christians, including wearing of badges and prohibitions on Christians working for Jews especially within their homes.

The value of the Jewish community to the royal treasury had become considerably lessened during the 13th century through two circumstances: the king's income from other sources had continually increased, and the contributions of the Jews had decreased both absolutely and relatively. Besides this, the king had found other sources from which to obtain loans. Italian merchants, "pope's usurers" as they were called, supplied him with money, at times on the security of the Jewry. By the contraction of the area in which Jews were permitted to exercise their money-lending activity their means of profit were lessened, while the king by his continuous exactions prevented the automatic growth of interest.

By the middle of the 13th century the Jews of England, like those of the Continent, had become chattels of the king. There appeared to be no limit to the exactions he could impose upon them, though it was obviously against his own interest to deprive them entirely of capital, without which they could not gain for him interest. The great financial pressure Henry placed on the Jews caused them to force repayment of loans, fuelling anti-Jewish resentment. Jewish bonds were purchased and used by richer Barons and members of Henry III's royal circle as a means to acquire lands of lesser landholders, through payment defaults.

Henry had built the Domus Conversorum in London in 1232 to help convert Jews to Christianity, and efforts intensified after 1239. As many as 10 percent of the Jews in England had been converted by the late 1250s in large part due to their deteriorating economic conditions.

Blood libels and Little Saint Hugh of Lincoln

Many anti-Jewish stories involving tales of child sacrifice circulated in the 1230s-50s, including the account of "Little Saint Hugh of Lincoln" in 1255. The event is considered particularly important, as the first such accusation endorsed by the Crown. In August 1255, a number of the chief Jews who had assembled at Lincoln to celebrate the marriage of a daughter of Berechiah de Nicole were seized on a charge of having murdered a boy named Hugh. Henry intervened to order the execution of Copin, who had confessed to the murder in return for his life, and removed 91 Jews to the Tower of London. 18 were executed, and their property expropriated by the Crown. The king had mortgaged the Jewish community to his brother Richard of Cornwall in February 1255, for 5,000 marks, and had lost all rights over it for a year, so did not provide Henry with income, except when executed. The story was referred to in later English literature including Chaucer and Marlowe, and entered popular folk culture through a contemporary ballad. It was quoted as fact by Thomas Fuller in his posthumous 1662 book Worthies of England.

Further restrictions and the Statute of Jewry 1253
Henry III passed the Statute of Jewry in 1253, which attempted to stop the construction of synagogues and reinforce the wearing of Jewish badges (rather than accepting fines). A prohibition on Christian servants working for Jews was to reduce the 'risk' of sexual contact, also prohibited. It remains unclear to what extent this statute was actually implemented by Henry. The laws themselves were following the Catholic church's existing pronouncements.

In the later 1250s, as Henry was not fully in control over government, the Barons asked for limits on the resale of Jewish bonds. Jewish loans became a motivating factor in the following war. Henry's policies up to 1258 of excessive Jewish taxation, anti-Jewish legislation and propaganda had caused a very important and negative change.

Targeting of Jews during the conflict with the Barons
While the level of debts to Jewish moneylenders was in fact lower in the 1260s than the 1230s, Henry III's policies had made the landowning classes fear that debts to Jews would lead to them being deprived of their lands, which were used to secure loans. Excessive taxation of Jews, forcing them to collect no matter what the circumstances, was one factor in this. The other was the King's support for courtiers and relatives who bought Jewish loans in order to dispossess defaulters of their landholdings. These were the fears that de Montfort and his supporters played on to bring support to their rebellion.

With the outbreak of the Barons' war violent measures were adopted to remove all traces of indebtedness either to the king or to the higher barons. The Jewries of London, Canterbury, Northampton, Winchester, Cambridge, Worcester, and Lincoln were looted (1263–65), and the archæ (official chests of records) either destroyed or deposited at the headquarters of the barons at Ely.

Simon de Montfort, who in 1231 had expelled the Jews from his town of Leicester, when at the height of his power after the battle of Lewes cancelled the debts and interest owed to Jews of around 60 men, including those held by his baronial supporters.

Montfort had been accused of sharing the plunder but issued edicts for their protection after the battle. Nevertheless, his closest allies including two of his sons had led the violence and killing, so it seems implausible to regard him as ignorant of the likely consequences of the campaign.

Later policies of Henry III
Once de Montfort was dead and the rebels were defeated, Henry's policy went into reverse and as best as he was able, the debts were reimposed. However, Henry's finances were very weak, and he also wished to pursue the Crusade that he had tried to mount in the 1250s. Parliament refused to comply without legislation that restricted the abuse of Jewish finances, particularly by Christians. In 1269 Henry agreed to limits on perpetual fee-rents, an end to the sale of Jewish loans to Christians without the permission of the Crown and a prohibition on levying interest on loans purchased by Christians. These were the grievances that had helped fuel the wider crisis since 1239. In 1271 he conceded a ban on Jews holding freehold land and again ordered that the previous legislation be enforced. Nevertheless, these policies would not be adequate in allaying wider fears, which quickly resurfaced under Edward I.

In Lincoln, Henry III ordered for a man by the name of Jopin, who was accused of murdering and torturing a 8/9 year old Christian boy in a witchcraft ceremony, to be killed along with another 91 Jews and all to be sent to London. When the executions were ongoing in London, Richard, Earl of Cornwall stopped the executions while 18 had already died. Similar cases happened in London and Northampton in the 1260s and 1270s.

Edward I and the Expulsion
Jews were expelled from the lands of Queen Dowager Eleanor in January 1275 (which included towns such as Guildford, Cambridge and Worcester).

Statutum de Judaismo, 1275

Edward I returned from the Crusades in 1274, two years after his accession as King of England. In 1275, he made some experimental decrees. The Church laws against usury had recently been reiterated with more than usual vehemence at the Second Council of Lyon (1274), and Edward in the Statutum de Judaismo (Statute of the Jewry) absolutely forbade Jews to lend on usury, but granted them permission to engage in commerce and handicrafts, and even to take farms for a period not exceeding ten years, though he expressly excluded them from all the feudal advantages of the possession of land.

This permission to own land, however, regarded as a means by which Jews in general could gain a livelihood, was illusory. Farming can not be taken up at a moment's notice, nor can handicrafts be acquired at once. Moreover, in England in the 13th century the guilds were already securing a monopoly of all skilled labour, and in the majority of markets only those could buy and sell who were members of the Guild Merchant.

By depriving the Jews of a resort to usury, Edward was practically preventing them from earning a living at all under the conditions of life then existing in feudal England; and in principle the "Statute of the Jewry" expelled them fifteen years before the final expulsion. Some of the Jews attempted to evade the law by resorting to the tricks of the Caursines, who lent sums and extorted bonds that included both principal and interest. Some resorted to highway robbery; others joined the Domus Conversorum; while a considerable number appear to have resorted to coin clipping as a means of securing a precarious existence. As a consequence, in 1278 the whole English Jewry was imprisoned; and no fewer than 293 Jews were executed at London.

Expulsion, 1290

After the failed experiments in legislation which Edward I made from 1269 onward, there was only one option left: If the Jews were not to have intercourse with their fellow citizens as artisans, merchants, or farmers, and were not to be allowed to take interest, the only alternative was for them to leave the country. He expelled the Jews in 1287 from Gascony, a province still then held by England and in which he was travelling at the time; and on his return to England (July 18, 1290) he issued writs to the sheriffs of all the English counties ordering them to enforce a decree to the effect that all Jews should leave England before All Saints' Day of that year. They were allowed to carry their portable property; but their houses escheated to the king, except in the case of a few favoured persons who were allowed to sell theirs before they left. Between 4,000 and 16,000 Jews were expelled. They emigrated to countries such as Poland that protected them by law.

Between the expulsion of the Jews in 1290 and their formal return in 1655 there is no official trace of Jews as such on English soil except in connection with the Domus Conversorum, which kept a number of them within its precincts up to 1551 and even later.

Anti-Judaism did not disappear with the expulsion of Jews. Jeremy Cohen writes about accusations of host desecration:
The story exerted its influence even in the absence of Jews ... the fourteenth and fifteenth centuries saw the proliferation of the Host-desecration story in England: in collections of miracle stories, many of them dedicated to the miracles of the Virgin Mary; in the art of illuminated manuscripts used for Christian prayer and meditation; and on stage, as in popular Croxton Play of the Sacrament, which itself evoked memories of an alleged ritual murder committed by Jews in East Anglia in 1191.

See also

History of the Jews in England
Edict of Expulsion
History of the Marranos in England
Resettlement of the Jews in England
Menasseh Ben Israel
Jewish Naturalization Act 1753
Influences on the standing of the Jews in England
Emancipation of the Jews in England
Early English Jewish literature
History of the Jews in Scotland
Aaron, Son of the Devil, an anti-Semitic caricature dated 1277

Notes

References
Butler, Lawrence. (1997) Clifford's Tower and the Castles of York. London: English Heritage. .
 
 
 
 
 
 
 
 
 
 
 
 
 
 
 
 

Jewish English history
Sephardi Jews topics
Society in medieval England
Medieval Jewish history